Strzegów may refer to the following places in Poland:
Strzegów, Lower Silesian Voivodeship (south-west Poland)
Strzegów, Lubusz Voivodeship (west Poland)
Strzegów, Opole Voivodeship (south-west Poland)